Eastern Freeway may stand for:
  Eastern Freeway (Mumbai), in Mumbai, India
  Eastern Freeway (Melbourne), in Melbourne, Australia